Fryxell is a small lunar impact crater that lies amidst the western inner ring of the Montes Rook. It is named for Roald H. Fryxell, an American geologist. It was previously designated Golitsyn B, a satellite of Golitsyn, before being assigned a name by the IAU. This crater is located on the Moon's far side, at the extreme edge of the region of the surface sometimes brought into view of the Earth due to libration. Even under rare conditions of favorable lighting and libration, this area would only be seen from the side amidst a rugged range of mountains. Thus this crater is best observed from orbit.

This formation is roughly circular, but with a slightly polygonal appearance. It is a bowl-shaped formation with a darker interior floor that is relatively featureless. The inner walls of Fryxell have a higher albedo than the surrounding terrain, and so appear relatively bright.

References

 
 
 
 
 
 
 
 
 
 
 
 

Impact craters on the Moon